Shaheed is a 1965 patriotic film directed by S. Ram Sharma, produced by Kewal Kashyap and starring Manoj Kumar, Kamini Kaushal and Pran in lead roles. Iftekhar, Nirupa Roy, Prem Chopra, Madan Puri and Anwar Hussain star in supporting roles. It is based on the life of Bhagat Singh. The music was composed by Prem Dhawan, with several songs being penned by freedom fighter Ram Prasad Bismil. Shaheed was the first of Manoj Kumar's series of patriotic films, followed by the likes of Upkar (1967), Purab Aur Paschim (1970) and Kranti (1981).

It was released on 1 January 1965 and became a box office success. The eleventh highest-grossing film of the year, it was given a verdict of "hit" by Box office India. At the 13th National Film Awards, Shaheed won the award for Best Feature Film in Hindi, the Nargis Dutt Award for Best Feature Film on National Integration and the award for Best Screenplay for B. K. Dutt and Din Dayal Sharma. 

The film was screened retrospectively on 15 August 2016 at the Independence Day Film Festival, jointly presented by the Indian Directorate of Film Festivals and Ministry of Defense, commemorating 70th Indian Independence Day.

Plot
It is the year 1911 in British India, Sardar Kishan Singh and his family, including son Bhagat, are distressed when Kishan's brother, Ajit Singh, is arrested for agitating people against the British. He then mysteriously disappears after supposedly escaping from prison and is never heard from again. This makes a strong impression on young Bhagat Singh's mind. When he grows up, he joins the movement for freedom struggle headed by Chandrashekar Azad. In 1928, he sees that Lala Lajpat Rai is lathi-charged by the police for leading a protest march against Simon Commission and later succumbs to his injuries. Bhagat, Chandrashekar Azad, Rajguru, Sukhdev, and Jaigopal decide to avenge this by killing the Assistant Superintendent J. P. Saunders. In December, they shot him dead as he was leaving a local police station. After the assassination, Bhagat and others decide to leave Lahore to avoid being arrested by CID or police. Bhagat changes his appearance to an Anglo-Indian gentlemen and evades Lahore along with Azad and Rajguru.

4 months later, Bhagat Singh and comrade Batukeshwar Dutt explode a bomb in the Central Legislative Assembly in Delhi as an act of protest. Together with other freedom fighters, including Bhagat's best friend Sukhdev, they are arrested and prosecuted, then thrown in prison. They are detained in the jail at Lahore, where they are continually persecuted and tortured by the prison guards.

After seeing the maltreatment of Indian prisoners, Bhagat and his fellow freedom fighters announce a hunger strike, during which Jatindranath dies. The government gives in and agrees to change the way prisoners are treated. As the case in the killing of Saunders continues, Bhagat and his comrades give poignant speeches in the court condemning British imperialism. Chandrashekhar Azad and Bhagwati Charan Vohra try to help the freedom fighters escape, but the attempt fails, and Bhagwati dies in the process. Chandrashekhar Azad subsequently kills himself (he vowed to never be captured alive) during his encounter with the British police in Alfred Park.

When the trial ends, Bhagat Singh, Rajguru and Sukhdev are all given death sentences. Fearing public protests, the British secretly send Bhagat Singh and Rajguru to the gallows a day before they are officially supposed to be executed. The men shout: "Long live the Revolution!" just before they are executed.

Cast
 Manoj Kumar as Bhagat Singh
 Prem Chopra as Sukhdev Thapar
 Anant Marathe as Shivaram Rajguru
 Kamini Kaushal as Vidyavati Kaur Sandhu (Bhagat's mother)
 Nirupa Roy as Durga Bhabhi
 Sailesh Kumar as Chail Bihari
 Manmohan as Chandra Shekhar Azad		
 Pran as Daku Kehar Singh
 Madan Puri as Major P. D. Chopra (Jailor of Lahore Central Jail)
 Asit Sen as Dhaniram		
 Anwar Hussain as Jail warden Chattar Singh
 Kamal Kapoor as Public Prosecutor Rai Bahadur Suryanarayan – Delhi
 Krishan Dhawan as Sardar Ajit Singh (Bhagat's uncle)
 D. K. Sapru as Sardar Kishan Singh Sandhu (Bhagat's father)		
 Indrani Mukherjee as Susheela										
 Iftekhar as Public Prosecutor, Lahore 														
 Raj Kishore as Jaigopal
 Pt. Jawaharlal Nehru as himself in a speech footage
 Mahatma Gandhi as himself in a speech footage
 Maulana Abdul Kalam Azad as himself in a speech footage
 Sardar Vallabhbhai Patel as himself in a speech footage								
 Sudhir as Yashwant (uncredited)

Soundtrack

Music: Prem Dhawan, Lyricist: Prem Dhawan (except Sarfaroshi ki Tamanna by Bismil Azimabadi)

References

External links
 

1965 films
Films set in the British Raj
1960s Hindi-language films
Films about Bhagat Singh
Indian historical films
Films scored by Prem Dhawan
Best Film on National Integration National Film Award winners
Best Hindi Feature Film National Film Award winners
Films whose writer won the Best Story National Film Award
Films set in Lahore
Cultural depictions of Jawaharlal Nehru
Cultural depictions of Mahatma Gandhi
Cultural depictions of Vallabhbhai Patel
Memorials to Abul Kalam Azad